Justice Bowen may refer to:

Charles Bowen, Baron Bowen (1835–1894), Lord Justice of Appeal of England
Jabez Bowen (1739–1815), chief justice of the Rhode Island Supreme Court
Ozias Bowen (1805–1871), associate justice of the Ohio Supreme Court
Thomas M. Bowen (1835–1906), associate justice of the Arkansas Supreme Court
William H. Bowen (1923–2014), associate justice of the Arkansas Supreme Court

See also
Judge Bowen (disambiguation)